William Robert Flood (born 10 April 1985) is an Irish former professional footballer who played as a midfielder. He earned 15 caps for his country at under-20 and under-21 levels. He represented eight clubs in England and Scotland including Manchester City, Cardiff City, Dundee United, Celtic, Middlesbrough and Aberdeen.

Early life
Flood was born in Dublin and grew up on a housing estate in the Ballyfermot area of the city. Flood started off his early career with Cherry Orchard before joining Manchester City. At the age of 14, Flood dislocated his patella playing in the All-Ireland Final. He described it as "very sore". Cherry Orchard won the final and Flood received a winners' medal, which was his only one until winning the Scottish League Cup in 2014 with Aberdeen. While at Cherry Orchard, Flood was mentored by Barry Pointon, who had known Flood since he was 15. Flood's Performances for Cherry Orchard attracted interest from Celtic, Manchester United and Arsenal, but he joined Manchester City.

Club career

Manchester City
When he joined Manchester City and signed a professional contract, Flood had injuries sorted by the club's medical team and quote: "If it wasn't for them I wouldn't be playing football"'.

After breaking through into the first team in 2002, he was sent out on loan spells to Rochdale and then Coventry City. Flood made his debut in the qualifying round of the 2003–04 UEFA Cup, in a 7–0 aggregate win over Total Network Solutions. His first career goal came in September 2004 when he scored Manchester City's third goal in a 7–1 win against Barnsley in the Football League Cup. Later in the 2003–04 season, Flood joined Rochdale on a month's loan.

He scored his first career league goal for Manchester City in November 2004 in a 1–1 draw at home to Norwich City. Manager Kevin Keegan was impressed with Flood's display following his performance. Following this performance, Flood signed a contract with Manchester City, up until 2007.

In the 2005–06 season, Flood joined Championship side Coventry City on a month's loan which was later extended into a second month. Flood scored his second career league goal in September 2005, in a 3–1 win at home to Watford.

Cardiff City
Flood joined Cardiff City for a fee of £200,000, paid in separate instalments, in 2006 and made 25 appearances for the Bluebirds. He scored just once for Cardiff, a memorable winning goal at Elland Road in August 2006. However, after struggling to settle at Ninian Park, he joined Dundee United on a season-long loan for the 2007/08 season as Cardiff manager Dave Jones wished to see how Flood would perform over a long season of first-team football.

Dundee United (loans)
Flood's debut resulted in a red card before half time on the opening day of the season, after collecting two cautions, and his second match, for the reserves, resulted in the same outcome. On this occasion, Flood was "bizarrely sent off...for taking a quick free kick when the referee was apparently not ready."

On 15 December 2007, he scored his first goal for Dundee United against St Mirren in a 3–0 win, a goal which later earned him the SPL Goal of the Season award. In follow-up interviews the next day, Flood said he would be disappointed to leave United at the end of the season, admitting he would be "gutted because I have loved it here."

Despite returning to Cardiff at the end of the season, a second season-long loan was agreed in July 2008. In the semi finals of the Scottish League Cup against Celtic, which finished 0–0 and went to a penalty shoot-out, Flood missed the eleventh penalty knocking Dundee United out of the competition. Four years on, Flood admitted that the penalty left him with bitter memories when he compared the penalty miss to Manchester United's match in the League Cup against Sunderland. When his move to Celtic came to light, Manager Craig Levein urged Flood to stay at Dundee United, rather than joining Celtic.

Celtic
Flood joined Celtic on 30 January 2009, signing a two-and-a-half-year contract for an undisclosed fee, for the team he supported as a boy. Upon joining the club, Flood's move to Celtic was not well received by Celtic's supporters, with some of them believing he was "not good enough for Parkhead".

He made his debut for Celtic against Rangers on 15 February 2009 at Celtic Park, playing for just over an hour before being substituted. Flood commented that making his debut was a "big shock" for him.

By the 2009–10 season, with Celtic under the management of Tony Mowbray, Flood found himself out of the first team and expressed unhappiness over this. At one point, Dundee United considered signing him, but the move did not materialise. Despite not being a first choice player, Flood made his Champions League debut when the club played against Arsenal in the Champions League Qualifying Round, coming on as substitute for Shaun Maloney in the 61st minute. The match ended with Arsenal winning 5–1 on aggregate.

In December 2009, Flood admitted he "regretted" joining Celtic, describing it as "a mistake".

After leaving Celtic, Flood stated he didn't consider himself as a Celtic player, citing his frustrating spells there. Despite this, he stated that Neil Lennon helped him keep his focus when he faced difficulties and for keeping him sane.

Middlesbrough
On 13 January 2010, it was announced that Flood had officially left Celtic for Middlesbrough, along with his teammates Barry Robson and Chris Killen.

He made his debut for the club, in a 1–0 loss against Sheffield United and then scored his first Boro goal in his second game against Swansea City on 23 January 2010, a cross which turned into a 35-yard shot into the top corner. After making eleven appearances, Flood sustained a knee injury in the second half of a match against Cardiff City. Initially there was no suggestion of major knee injury, but in fact Flood was out for the rest of the season.

Ahead of the 2010–11 season, Flood recovered from the knee injury and joined the club's pre-season. While in pre-season, Flood aimed to force his way back into the first team at Middlesbrough. However, he was ruled out early in the 2010–11 season after suffering a serious injury in Middlesbrough's opening league game against Ipswich Town. Flood was taken off before half time after a collision with teammate Matthew Bates with manager Strachan expressing sympathy for Flood. After six months out, Flood made his return to the first team training.

Flood made his first appearance from injury when he played 60 minutes for the club's reserve Team against Leeds United reserves. Following the match, Flood was praised by Tony Mowbray on his return. Two months later, on 16 April 2011, Flood made his first appearance since being injured when he came on as a substitute for Andy Halliday as Middlesbrough drew 1–1 with Barnsley.

On 10 May, it was announced that Flood would be released along with Maximilian Haas and Andrew Davies.

Dundee United (third spell)

In May 2011, Flood returned to Dundee United, where he signed a two-year contract with the club. Craig Conway, leaving Dundee United, was reported to say this was a "good piece of business" and the fans will enjoy his arrival. Upon joining Dundee United, Flood said: "Without a doubt I played my best football here at United. That was the best time of my career." He was previously linked with a move to Hearts.

Flood made his second debut for the club when he played 90 minutes against Śląsk Wrocław, in a Europa League Second qualifying round game that Dundee United lost 1–0. However, Dundee United were eliminated from the Europa League through away goals, despite winning 3–2 in the return game. Flood made his second debut in the league in the opening game of the season, in a 1–1 draw against Kilmarnock. In the Scottish League Cup quarter final against Falkirk, Flood missed the third penalty in the penalty shoot-out, resulting in Dundee United's Elimination from the tournament. After the match, Flood had to make an apology to Manager Peter Houston via text. In a 3–1 loss against Rangers on 5 November 2011, Gregg Wylde received a red card after kicking Flood.

His first goal after his return was a "superb, low 30-yard drive found the far corner of the Hearts net", in a 2–2 draw against Hearts on 28 April 2012.

In the 2012–13 season, Flood scored in the Europa League qualifying third round tie, against Dynamo Moscow, which finished in a draw, 2–2. Despite making a start in the return leg, Dundee United were heavily beaten, losing 5–0 (agg. 7–2). Despite being eliminated from the Europa League, Flood set up two goals, as Dundee United won 3–0 against their derby rival, Dundee on 17 August 2012. Flood added further goals Dundee on 7 December 2012 and against Hearts on 9 February 2013.

At the end of the 2012–13 season, Flood stated his desire extend his contract and to stay at the club, and he expected 'something can get sorted', while new Manager Jackie McNamara, who replaced Peter Houston, said he was keen for Flood to stay at the club.

During his second two-year spell at Dundee United, he made 69 appearances and scoring three times.

Aberdeen
On 31 May 2013, it was announced that Flood had signed a pre-contract with Aberdeen. Manager Derek McInnes was keen to sign Flood and described him as an "ideal" signing.

Flood scored his first goal for Aberdeen in the opening game of the season, as Aberdeen beat Kilmarnock 2–1. After the match, McInnes said about Flood, "[The performance of] Willo Flood was exactly why I brought him here. He'll be the catalyst for anything we do. He's energetic, passionate and dictates the tempo of the game, with and without the ball."'' After making four appearances, Flood sustained a hamstring injury while chasing a ball, as Aberdeen beat Alloa Athletic 6–5 in penalty shoot-out in the second round of Scottish League Cup. After a scan, which showed that Flood had torn his muscle, it was announced that Flood would be out for six weeks. However, after four weeks out, Flood made his return, in a 1–0 loss against Ross County. After making his return, Flood said that being on the sidelines is "frustrating". Flood suffered a further hamstring injury, which he sustained in a 3–1 loss against Hearts on 9 November 2013 and it was announced that Flood would be out for a further six weeks. Flood made his return for the club, on 7 December 2013, where he came on as a substitute for Jonny Hayes, as Aberdeen beat St Johnstone 2–0.

On 10 January 2014, in the 87th minute he scored a 22-yard winning goal in a 1–0 home win against Hibernian a goal that was later voted SPFL Goal of the Month for January. After helping Aberdeen reach the Scottish League Cup and Scottish Cup quarter-finals, Manager McInnes praised Flood performance, citing "consistency of performance, he brings an attitude to the team and he brings a real mentality to the whole club." Flood was in the squad for the Scottish League Cup final against Inverness Caledonian Thistle, playing the entire match, which finished 0–0 after extra–time, with Aberdeen winning 4–2 on penalties. Flood scored again on 2 April 2014, as Aberdeen drew 1–1 with Hearts. Flood's first season at Aberdeen ended positively, with the Club winning their first Scottish League Cup in nineteen years, and finishing third place in the league, with Flood making 40 appearances and scoring three times in all competitions.

Flood's second season saw him play 90 minutes in all the club's six matches in the Europa League. He continued to be in the first team and provided an assist for Peter Pawlett, in a 3–0 win over Ross County on 20 September 2014. Flood, however, again injured his hamstring and had to be substituted during the match against Celtic resulting in him being sidelined for two months. He made his return coming on as a substitute for David Goodwillie, in the 86th minute of a 2–0 win over Motherwell on 4 January 2015.
On 14 July 2016 his contract was terminated.

Dundee United (fourth spell)
Flood returned to Dundee United in July 2016 for his fourth spell with the club, initially signing a one-year deal. After twice failing to win promotion back to the Scottish Premiership, Flood was one of a number of players released by the club in May 2018.

Dunfermline Athletic and Bali United 

Following his departure from Dundee United, Flood signed a one-year contract with fellow Scottish Championship club Dunfermline Athletic on 18 June 2018. Flood left Dunfermline just over a week after signing with the club, as he had received an offer from Indonesian club Bali United. He was officially announced as a Bali player on 6 July 2018. However, three days later, it was reported that eligibility rules on foreign players had meant that the deal could not be completed.

Retirement

Flood announced his retirement from football aged 34, with the aim of pursuing a career as a football agent, in August 2019.

International career
Having represented the Republic of Ireland under-20 squad the previous year, Flood was called up for the under-21 squad in 2004. His good performances resulted in Republic of Ireland U21 team manager Don Givens suggesting he could be the next captain.

Flood's performance at Aberdeen caught the eye of Roy Keane, earning him a call-up to the Republic of Ireland Senior squad.

Career statistics

Personal life
Flood has a brother, Shane, and grew up in a family of Celtic supporters.

In December 2005, Flood's home in Wythenshawe was the subject of a burglary in which Flood himself was threatened and taunted at knifepoint for over 20 minutes by a 29-year-old man. The ordeal left Flood with recurring nightmares, resulting in him needing counselling and being unable to live alone.

Honours
Aberdeen
 Scottish League Cup: 2013–14

Dundee United
 Scottish Challenge Cup: 2016–17

Individual
 Scottish Premier League Goal of the Season: 2007–08

References

External links

1985 births
Living people
Association footballers from Dublin (city)
Republic of Ireland association footballers
Republic of Ireland youth international footballers
Republic of Ireland under-21 international footballers
Association football midfielders
Manchester City F.C. players
Rochdale A.F.C. players
Coventry City F.C. players
Cardiff City F.C. players
Celtic F.C. players
Middlesbrough F.C. players
Dundee United F.C. players
Aberdeen F.C. players
Dunfermline Athletic F.C. players
Premier League players
English Football League players
Scottish Premier League players
Scottish Professional Football League players
Republic of Ireland expatriate association footballers
Expatriate footballers in England
Expatriate footballers in Wales
Expatriate footballers in Scotland
Cherry Orchard F.C. players